Fernando José Riera Ros (born 20 April 1940) is a Spanish boxer. He competed in the men's lightweight event at the 1960 Summer Olympics.

References

External links
 

1940 births
Living people
Spanish male boxers
Olympic boxers of Spain
Boxers at the 1960 Summer Olympics
People from Ribera Baixa
Sportspeople from the Province of Valencia
Lightweight boxers